The seventh season of the American competitive reality television series MasterChef premiered on Fox on June 1, 2016 and concluded on September 14, 2016.

Gordon Ramsay and Christina Tosi returned as judges. Graham Elliot left the show after six seasons. In this season, the third judge was a series of guest judges.

The season was won by Shaun O'Neale with Brandi Mudd and David Williams finishing as co-runners-up. This season marked the first time that three home cooks competed in the finale.

Top 20
Source for names, hometowns, and ages. Occupations and nicknames as given on air or stated in cites.

Elimination table
 

 (WINNER) This cook won the competition.
 (RUNNER-UP) This cook finished as a runner-up in the finals.
 (WIN) The cook won the individual challenge (Mystery Box Challenge, Skills Test, Pressure Test, or Elimination Test).
 (WIN) The cook was on the winning team in the Team Challenge and directly advanced to the next round.
 (HIGH) The cook was one of the top entries in the individual challenge but didn't win.
 (IN) The cook wasn't selected as a top or bottom entry in an individual challenge.
 (IN) The cook wasn't selected as a top or bottom entry in a team challenge.
 (IMM) The cook didn't have to compete in that round of the competition and was safe from elimination.
 (IMM) The cook was selected by Mystery Box Challenge winner and didn't have to compete in the Elimination Test.
 (PT) The cook was on the losing team in the Team Challenge, competed in the Pressure Test, and advanced.
 (NPT) The cook was on the losing team in the Team Challenge, did not compete in the Pressure Test, and advanced.
 (LOW) The cook was one of the bottom entries in an individual challenge or Pressure Test, but advanced.
 (LOW) The cook was one of the bottom entries in the Team Challenge, but advanced.
 (ELIM) The cook was eliminated from MasterChef.

Guest judges
 Wolfgang Puck - Episode 3; Episodes 18-19
 Aarón Sanchez - Episodes 5-7
 Edward Lee - Episodes 8-11
 Kevin Sbraga - Episodes 12-15
 Richard Blais - Episode 16-17
 Daniel Boulud - Episodes 18-19

Main guest appearances
 Nick Nappi - Episode 4
 Claudia Sandoval - Episode 5

Episodes

References

2016 American television seasons
MasterChef (American TV series)